In mathematics, the Hurewicz theorem is a basic result of algebraic topology, connecting homotopy theory with homology theory via a map known as the Hurewicz homomorphism. The theorem is named after Witold Hurewicz, and generalizes earlier results of Henri Poincaré.

Statement of the theorems
The Hurewicz theorems are a key link between homotopy groups and homology groups.

Absolute version
For any path-connected space X and positive integer n there exists a group homomorphism

called the Hurewicz homomorphism, from the n-th homotopy group to the n-th homology group (with integer coefficients).

The Hurewicz theorem states cases in which the Hurewicz homomorphism is an isomorphism.

 For , if X is -connected (that is:  for all i<n), then  for all i<n, and the Hurewicz map  is an isomorphism. This implies, in particular, that the homological connectivity equals the homotopical connectivity when the latter is at least 1. In addition, the Hurewicz map  is an epimorphism in this case.
 For , the Hurewicz homomorphism induces an isomorphism , between the abelianization of the first homotopy group (the fundamental group) and the first homology group.

Relative version
For any pair of spaces  and integer  there exists a homomorphism

from relative homotopy groups to relative homology groups. This is proved in, for example,  by induction, proving in turn the absolute version and the Homotopy Addition Lemma.

Triadic version
For any triad of spaces  (i.e., a space X and subspaces A, B) and integer  there exists a homomorphism

from triad homotopy groups to triad homology groups. Note that 

The proof of this theorem uses a higher homotopy van Kampen type theorem for triadic homotopy groups, which requires a notion of the fundamental -group of an n-cube of spaces.

Simplicial set version
The Hurewicz theorem for topological spaces can also be stated for n-connected simplicial sets satisfying the Kan condition.

Rational Hurewicz theorem

Then the Hurewicz map 

Notes

References
 

 
 
 

 
 

Theorems in homotopy theory
Homology theory
Theorems in algebraic topology